is a Japanese actor, entertainer and singer. He is  best known for his role as Yagyū Hiroshi in The Prince of Tennis musicals. He was one of PureBOYS.

Filmography

Television
Ren'ai Shindan ~Sayonara no Melody~ (TV Tokyo, 2007) [ep. 4-6]
Shinigami no Ballad (TV Tokyo, 2007) as Suzuki Shunsuke [ep.3]
Top Caster (Fuji TV, 2006) as a guest in ep.8
Yoshitsune (NHK, 2005) as guest
Orange Days (TBS, 2004)
Kirarin Revolution (ep.129)
Cat Street (NHK, 2008) as Yamaguchi Ken [ep.3]
Rikuoh (TBS, 2017)
Bakabon no Papa yori Baka na Papa (NHK, 2018)
Shitamachi Rocket 2 (TBS, 2018)

Film
Toho 3 on 3
Tonari no 801-chan (2007)
BOYS LOVE Theater Edition (2007)
Mousou Shoujo Otaku kei (2007) as Chiba-kun
Cafe Daikanyama ~Sweet Boys~ (2008) as Ishikawa Gaku
Kizumomo (2008) as Tomita Aki
Creepy (2016) as Matsuoka
99.9 Criminal Lawyer: The Movie (2021)

Stage 
Prince of Tennis Musical - Absolute King Rikkai feat. Rokkaku Chuu ~first service~ as Yagyuu Hiroshi
Prince of Tennis Musical - Dream Live 4th as Yagyuu Hiroshi
Prince of Tennis Musical - Absolute King Rikkai feat. Rokkaku Chuu ~second service~ as Yagyuu Hiroshi
7Cheers!~Tobe! Jibun To Iu Daichi Kara~ [with PureBOYS]
Prince of Tennis Musical - The Progressive Match Higa Chuu feat Rikkai as Yagyuu Hiroshi
Prince of Tennis Musical - Dream Live 5th as Yagyuu Hiroshi
7Dummy's Blues [with PureBOYS]
Prince of Tennis Musical - Dream Live 7th as Yagyuu Hiroshi
Persona 4 VISUALIVE - as "Hero"

DVD 

Herbie Live Talk DVD Vol 4 (Studiowarp, released July 17, 2007)
Natural Face Vol 2 (Studiowarp, released Jan 25, 2008)
Natural Face Vol 5 (Studiowarp, released March 10, 2008)
Natural Face Vol 9 (Studiowarp, released April 25, 2008)
Whitecube Vol 1 (Studiowarp, released April 30, 2008)
Flying High (PONY CANYON, released Feb 20, 2008)

CD 

Best Actor Series 008 - Nakagauchi Masataka as Niou Masaharu and Baba Tooru as Yagyuu Hiroshi (2007)
Drama CD "Drug-On Dragon" (2007)

Photobook 

Ambitious Vol 1 (Studiowarp, released June 25, 2008)
Baba~nzu Style (Studiowarp, released July 17, 2008)
Baba~nzu Style- The Other Cut (Studiowarp, released November 25, 2007)
PureBOYS 1st photo collection (Goma Books, released November 16, 2007)
Meng (Fusosha, released March 19, 2008)

CM 
Nivea Face Eight-Four
TV Saitama Mitsui Housing

References

External links
Official profile
Personal blog

1988 births
Living people
Japanese male actors